Neoclytus nubilus is a species of beetle in the family Cerambycidae. It was described by Linsley in 1933.

References

Neoclytus
Beetles described in 1933